Correzzola is a comune (municipality) in the Province of Padua in the Italian region Veneto, located about  southwest of Venice and about  southeast of Padua.

Correzzola borders the following municipalities: Agna, Candiana, Chioggia, Codevigo, Cona, Pontelongo.

Demographic evolution

References

Cities and towns in Veneto